Events from the year 1517 in India.

Events
 Ibrahim Lodi become ruler of the Sultanate of Delhi following his father's (Sikandar Lodi) death

Deaths
 20 November – Sikandar Lodi, ruler of the Sultanate of Delhi from 1489

See also

 Timeline of Indian history

References